Carew Castle is a castle in the civil parish of Carew in Pembrokeshire, Wales. The Carew family take their name from this site and have owned the castle for more than 900 years. It is leased to the Pembrokeshire Coast National Park for administration purposes.
.

Construction
The present castle, which replaced an earlier stone keep, is constructed almost entirely from the local Carboniferous limestone, except for some of the Tudor architectural features such as window frames, which are made from imported Cotswold stone. Although originally a Norman stronghold the castle maintains a mixture of architectural styles as modifications were made to the structure over successive centuries.

Entry to the inner ward is across a dry moat that had a barbican and gatehouse. The front of the castle had three D-shaped towers and crenelated walls. The rear of the castle has two large round towers. In the 16th century the northern defensive wall was converted into a Tudor range with ornate windows and long gallery.

The outer ward has earthworks that were built by Royalist defenders during the English Civil War in the 1640s.

History
The use of the site for military purposes extends back at least 2000 years.

Early history
The castle stands on a limestone bluff overlooking the Carew inlet, part of the tidal estuary that makes up the Milford Haven Waterway. The site must have been recognised as strategically useful from the earliest times, and recent excavations in the outer ward have discovered multiple defensive walls of an Iron Age fort.

The Norman castle has its origins in a stone keep built by Gerald de Windsor around the year 1100. Gerald was made castellan of Pembroke Castle by Arnulf of Montgomery in the first Norman invasion of Pembrokeshire. He married Nest, princess of Deheubarth around 1095. Nest brought the manor of Carew as part of her dowry, and Gerald cleared the existing fort to build his own castle on Norman lines. The original outer walls were timber, and only the keep was of stone. This still exists in the later structure as the "Old Tower".

Medieval

Gerald's son William took the name "de Carew", and in the middle of the 12th century created an enclosure with stone walls incorporating the original keep, and a "Great Hall" inside it. The current high-walled structure with a complex of rooms and halls around the circumference was created in about 1270 by Nicholas de Carew (d.1297), concurrent with (and influenced by) the construction of the Edwardian castles in North Wales. At this time, the outer ward was also walled in.

Tudor period

The de Carews fell on hard times in the post-Black Death period and mortgaged the castle. It fell into the hands of Rhys ap Thomas, who made his fortune by strategically changing sides and backing Henry Tudor just before the battle of Bosworth.

Rewarded with lands and a knighthood, he extended the castle with luxurious apartments with many Tudor features in the late 15th century. An inner doorway is decorated with three coats of arms: those of Henry VII, his son Arthur and Arthur's wife Catherine of Aragon. This allegiance turned sour. Rhys' grandson Rhys ap Gruffudd fell out of favour and was executed by Henry VIII for treason in 1531. The castle thus reverted to the crown and was leased to various tenants. In 1558 it was acquired by Sir John Perrot, a Lord Deputy of Ireland, who completed the final substantial modifications of the castle. The Elizabethan plutocrat reconstructed the north walls to build a long range of domestic rooms.

Demise

Perrot subsequently fell out of favour and died imprisoned in the Tower of London in 1592. The castle reverted to the crown and was finally re-purchased by the de Carew family in 1607. In the Civil War, the castle was refortified by Royalists although south Pembrokeshire was strongly Parliamentarian. After changing hands three times, the south wall was pulled down to render the castle indefensible to Royalists. At the Restoration the castle was returned to the de Carews, who continued to occupy the eastern wing until 1686.

The castle was then abandoned and allowed to decay. Much of the structure was looted for building stone and for lime burning. Since 1984 Cadw has funded a substantial amount of restoration performed by the Pembrokeshire National Park Authority.

Tidal mill
Carew Tidal Mill  is the only restored tidal mill in Wales. The origins of the mill are undocumented but evidence suggests that a mill was in existence on the site by 1542. A commission dated 1630 indicates that Sir John Carew had restored the floodgates and causeway walls 15 years earlier. The present building dates from the early 19th century, one of the two mill wheels carries the date 1801. The mill has also often been referred to as the "French Mill", which may be a reference to the use of French burr grinding stones or to its French-inspired design.

Although no longer working, all the mill machinery is still intact.

Gallery

References

External links

Carew Castle at castles-of-wales.com
Carew Castle & Tidal Mill – Official Website
MyPembrokeshire.com – History & Heritage – Carew Castle
www.geograph.co.uk : photos of Carew Castle and surrounding area
Carew Castle on NetWales - Information and Photos

Further reading

Castles in Pembrokeshire
Scheduled monuments in Pembrokeshire
Sites of Special Scientific Interest in Pembrokeshire
Grade I listed buildings in Pembrokeshire
Historic house museums in Wales
Museums in Pembrokeshire
Mill museums in Wales
Grade I listed castles in Wales
Castle ruins in Wales
Tide mills